The following is the chart of the International Phonetic Alphabet, a standardized system of phonetic symbols devised and maintained by the International Phonetic Association. It is not a complete list of all possible speech sounds in the world's languages, only those about which stand-alone articles exist in this encyclopedia.

Official chart

Vowels

Consonants

Pulmonic consonants

Non-pulmonic consonants

Co-articulated consonants

Other consonants
 Nasal palatal approximant 
 Nasal labial–velar approximant 
 Voiceless nasal glottal approximant 
 Voiceless bilabially post-trilled dental stop 
 Voiceless bidental fricative

Tones

Auxiliary symbols

See also
 IPA vowel chart with audio
 IPA pulmonic consonant chart with audio
 International Phonetic Alphabet chart for English dialects
 Extensions to the International Phonetic Alphabet
 Obsolete and nonstandard symbols in the International Phonetic Alphabet

External links
 The International Phonetic Alphabet and the IPA Chart
 Interactive IPA chart

chart
Charts